is a railway station in the town of Kawazu, Shizuoka Prefecture, Japan, operated by the privately owned Izu Kyūkō Line .

Lines

Station layout
The station has two elevated opposing side platforms serving two tracks. The platforms are connected by an underpass, and the station building is underneath the platforms and tracks. The station is staffed.

Platforms

Adjacent stations

History 
Kawazu Station was opened on December 10, 1961.

Passenger statistics
In fiscal 2017, the station was used by an average of 793 passengers daily (boarding passengers only).

Surrounding area
Kawazu Town Hall
Japan National Route 135

See also
 List of Railway Stations in Japan

References

External links

official home page.

Railway stations in Shizuoka Prefecture
Izu Kyūkō Line
Railway stations in Japan opened in 1961
Stations of Izu Kyūkō
Kawazu, Shizuoka